Srivaikundam Duraisamy Subbulakshmi was an Indian actress and singer who was active in Tamil cinema during the 1930s and 1940s. She was the wife of film director K. Subramanyam. She is credited with having introduced the singer and family friend of hers, M. S. Subbulakshmi to Tamil cinema and mentored her in her early days.

Early life
S. D. Subbulakshmi was born in Srivaikundam to Duraisamy and Janaki Ammal. Since childhood, S. D. Subbulakshmi had shown keen interest in stage dramas. The family moved to Madurai, where she learned carnatic music and dance. Her parents took photos of her in various makeups and showed them to a number of drama companies. This had assisted her to start as a child actress in stage plays. She grew up acting in stage dramas and managed to act in a number of dramas with well-known artists such as M. K. Thyagaraja Bhagavathar, K. B. Sundarambal and T. R. Mahalingam and earned a very good name. Pavalakkodi was one such drama where she had acted with M. K. Thiagaraja Bhagavather and became very famous.

Cinema life
Letchumanan Chettiar or Lena Chettiar of Krishna Pictures, who has seen the drama wanted to picturise the drama and requested K. Subrahmanyam to direct that film. Lena Chettiar and K. Subrahmanyam watched the drama together. K. Subrahmanyam suggested to retain the same artists who acted in drama to be in the film too and Lena Chettiar agreed to this. Through Pavalakkodi, S. D. Subbulakshmi entered into Tamil Cinema in 1934. She became a famous heroine in the 1930s till mid-1940s, then she switched to mother and supporting roles.

Introducing M. S. Subbulakshmi
S. D. Subbulakshmi became instrumental in introducing M. S. Subbulakshmi when she persuaded K. Subrahmanyam to give the daughter of her friend Madurai Shanmugavadivu, a chance on the concert stage at the exhibition he was organising in connection with the 1932 Mahamagam Festival in Kumbakonam. Thus, it was also K. Subrahmanyam who first helped to make M. S. Subbulakshmi a star in the world of song. It was on that stage that M. S. Subbulakshmi became a star.

Later, when he negotiated with Sadasivam for the film rights for a story serialised in Ananda Vikatan, starring M. S. Subbulakshmi in the film, she came almost as part of the package. Thus started M. S. Subbulakshmi's film career in Sevasadanam with S. D. Subbulakshmi guiding throughout.

Family life
S. D. Subbulakshmi married the famous prolific lawyer turned director K. Subramanyam with the consent of his first wife Meenatchi. K. Subramanyam kept both the families together and managed them without any discrimination between them until his last breath. She was blessed with a son Abaswaram Ramji.

Filmography

References

External links
Article on S. D. Subbulakshmi

Indian film actresses
Actresses in Tamil cinema
Tamil actresses
20th-century Indian actresses
Tamil playback singers
Indian women playback singers
20th-century Indian singers
Actresses from Madurai
Singers from Tamil Nadu
20th-century Indian women singers
Women musicians from Tamil Nadu
Actresses in Malayalam cinema
Actresses in Kannada cinema